Hopeville may refer to:

Hopeville, Indiana
Hopeville, West Virginia